Howmeh Rural District is a rural district (dehestan) in the Central District of Larestan County, Fars Province, Iran. At the 2006 census, its population was 14,629, in 3,135 families.  The rural district has 33 villages.

References 

Rural Districts of Fars Province
Larestan County